Voineasa is a commune in Olt County, Oltenia, Romania. It is composed of five villages: Blaj, Mărgăritești, Racovița, Rusăneștii de Sus and Voineasa.

References

Communes in Olt County
Localities in Oltenia